Batrachorhina madagascariensis is a species of beetle in the family Cerambycidae. It was described by James Thomson in 1868. It is known from Madagascar.

References

Batrachorhina
Beetles described in 1868